The Brilliance H3 sedan is a compact car produced by Brilliance Auto aimed to replace the Brilliance H330 series.

Overview

The engine options for the Brilliance H3 includes a 1.5 liter engine producing 112 horsepower and a 1.5 liter turbo producing 150 horsepower and 220 N·m. The engines are mated to either a 5-speed manual gearbox or a 5-speed automatic gearbox. The 0-100km/h acceleration is 10.11 seconds as tested by Chinese automotive media, Autohome.

Prices of the Brilliance H3 compact sedan ranges from 63,900 to 88,900 yuan.

References

External links

Brilliance H3 website

H3
Cars of China
Compact cars
2010s cars
Front-wheel-drive vehicles
Cars introduced in 2016